Rubí is a Spanish-language television series written by Leonardo Padrón and produced by W Studios for Televisa, and Univision. It is a reboot based on the 2004 Mexican telenovela of the same name, and the third production of the Fábrica de sueños franchise. The series premiered first in the United States on 21 January 2020 on Univision, and ended on 27 February 2020 with a total of 26 episodes. It stars Camila Sodi as the title character.

Premise 
The story revolves around a young journalist named Carla (Ela Velden) who convinces Rubí (Camila Sodi), a mysterious woman who lives in a dark mansion, to tell the story of her life and why she isolated herself from the outside world out of free will. It is then that we find out that Rubí was an ambitious woman of humble origins determined to use her impressive beauty and female gimmicks to escape poverty and achieve fame, regardless of whether she harmed innocent people to achieve it.

Cast 
The cast and character were revealed by People en Español magazine in September 2019 and January 2020 respectively.

Main 
 Camila Sodi as Rubi Perez Ochoa, she is an ambitious woman who uses her beauty to obtain benefits. And Hector Ferrer's former wife
 José Ron as Alejandro Cardenas, he is a cardiologist and Rubí's first love.
 Rodrigo Guirao as Hector Ferrer Garza, he is a famous architect, former fiance of Maribel and later Rubí's husband.
 Kimberly Dos Ramos as Maribel de la Fuente, she is Rubí's former best friend and Hector's ex-fiance
 Ela Velden as Carla Rangel / Fernanda Perez Ochoa, she is a journalist and Rubi's niece who years later grows up and pretends to be Carla Rangel in order to obtain information from her aunt.
 Valery Saís as Child Fernanda
 Tania Lizardo as Cristina Perez Ochoa, Rubi's sister.
 Marcus Ornellas as Lucas Fuentes Morab he is a famous clothing designer who becomes obsessed with the beauty of Rubi
 Lisardo as Arturo de la Fuente, Maribel's father.
 Alejandra Espinoza as Sonia Aristimuno, Alejandro's ex-fiance
 María Fernanda García as Rosa Ortiz de la Fuente, Maribel's mother.
 Henry Zakka as Boris, Rubí's bodyguard.
 Rubén Sanz as Prince Eduardo of Spain
 Alfredo Gatica as Loreto Mata, Rubi's best friend.
 Giuseppe Gamba as Napoleon, Alejandro's best friend.

 Antonio Fortier as Cayetano Gómez, he is Arturo's driver and Cristina's boyfriend.
 Paola Toyos as Queca Gallardo, she is a famous blogger who writes scandals about the lives of famous entrepreneurs.
 Mayrín Villanueva as Refugio Ochoa de Perez, Rubi and Cristina's mother.

Guest stars 
 Gerardo Murguía as Dr. Mandieta, he is the director of the private university where Rubi studied.
 Juan Soler as  Hector Ferrer Garza, Hector's father.

Production 
In July 2019, W Studios and Lemon Films began development on a new remake of the 2004 hit Mexican drama Rubí with Carlos Bardasano as producer. Previously in May 2019 Bardasano confirmed that the new adaptation would be a remake, but that in turn would be a sequel and clarifying that: "The story will not only address those aspects known to the public, but will explore what happened to the character years after." The filming of the series officially began on 20 July 2019, and concluded at the beginning of October 2019 in Madrid, Spain. The main theme song of the series is "¿A quién le importa?", is performed by Sodi, whose aunt, Thalía, had covered years prior.

Reception 
The series received both positive and negative reviews from the audience. Sodi's performance was compared to that of Bárbara Mori's from the 2004 adaptation. It premiered on 21 January 2020 in the United States with a total of 1.66 million total viewers (P2 +) and had a total of 749 thousand adults between 18–49 years, being the best debut of a Univision fiction at 10 p.m. since 2017. With respect to its competition El Señor de los Cielos, the series obtained good ratings.

Ratings

U.S. ratings 
 
}}

Mexico ratings 

}}

Episodes

Special

References

External links 
 

2020 telenovelas
Mexican telenovelas
American telenovelas
2020 Mexican television series debuts
2020 American television series debuts
Televisa telenovelas
Television series produced by W Studios
Television series produced by Lemon Films
Univision telenovelas
Television series based on adaptations
Mexican LGBT-related television shows
2020s American LGBT-related drama television series
2020 American television series endings
2020 Mexican television series endings